The sawdust trail or the sawdust circuit consisted of a series of temporary buildings or tents used by itinerant ministers for revival meetings.

Tabernacle floors were covered with sawdust to dampen the noise of shuffling feet (as well as for its pleasant smell and its ability to hold down the dust of dirt floors), and coming forward during the invitation became known as "hitting the sawdust trail."

"The Rev. William A. (Billy) Sunday, one of the most noted evangelists of the old 'sawdust trail,' died suddenly tonight of a heart attack in the home of his brother-in-law, William J. Thompson, a florist."

Sunday repeatedly used the metaphor throughout his career. He told his audiences to "hit the sawdust trail" and give their lives to Jesus. At his revival meetings, "trail hitters" would walk up the center aisle strewn with sawdust and shake Sunday's hand as a public manifestation of their conversion experience.

See also
Chitlin' Circuit
Borscht Belt

References

Christian revivals